A Tale of 2 Cities is a Singaporean Chinese drama which was co-produced by Media Prima Berhad and MediaCorp TV. It was telecasted on Singapore's free-to-air terrestrial television channel form MediaCorp TV Channel 8. It stars Rui En, Joanne Peh, Pierre Png, Zhang Yaodong, Mimi Chu, Zhang Zhenhuan, Kate Pang, Yao Wenlong & Julie Tan as the casts of the series. Live it made its debut on 14 February to 11 March 2011. This drama serial consists of 21-episodes and was screened on every weekday nightlife at 21:00 until 22:00 SST and rerun it made from 19 to 30 December 2011 at every weekday night at 21:00 until 22:00 SST.

It was telecasted on Malaysia's free-to-air terrestrial television channel form NTV7 channel it was telecasted on Singapore's free-to-air terrestrial television channel form MediaCorp TV Channel 8.

In Malaysia, it will be broadcast on the NTV7 primetime drama slot at every weekday evening at 18:00 until 19:00 MST it was filming locations is done in Singapore (a national capital of Singapore) and Kuala Lumpur (a national capital of Malaysia).

This drama has four main couples, namely, Rui En with Pierre Png, Joanne Peh with Zhang Yaodong, Julie Tan with Zhang Zhenhuan, and Kate Pang with Yao Wenlong. Due to a number of famous artistes acting in this drama it attracted 904,000 viewers. All episodes can be viewed in xinmsn catchup.

Episodes 6, 12, 13, 16 to 20 were rated PG in the encore version.

Cast

Main cast

Other cast

Trivia
This drama is the first MediaCorp TV drama in 2011 to have an instrumental music for the opening theme, the next three shows with music as the opening theme are C.L.I.F., On the Fringe and Bountiful Blessings.
Some scenes in this drama were shot in Kuala Lumpur. However, it is not a co-production with NTV7. Some Kuala Lumpur scenes were also shot in Singapore.
Originally this drama had intended to produce 21-episodes, but there would be an additional episode due to overruns in filming.
Mimi Chu apparently plays two roles, as Mei Jinfeng and the "Fairy Godmother" in Yale's dreams (eps 1 & 21).
Joanne Peh and Zhang Yaodong paired up again after The Greatest Love of All and Your Hand In Mine.
Huang Wenyong and Xiang Yun were paired up for many times. Their recent pair-up was The Score.
In Your Hand In Mine, Huang Wenyong and Yao Wenlong were brothers. In this drama, they are father and son.
In Joys of Life, Yao Wenlong and Kate Pang were father and daughter. In this drama, they are husband and wife
The show was originally called 'Love In Two Cities'

2012 Accolades

Show 1

Show 2

International broadcast

See also
The Making of A Tale of 2 Cities (1) on Youtube
The Making of A Tale of 2 Cities (2) on Youtube
List of programmes broadcast by MediaCorp Channel 8

Singapore Chinese dramas
2011 Singaporean television series debuts
2011 Singaporean television series endings
Channel 8 (Singapore) original programming